San Juan Quiahije is a town and municipality in Oaxaca in south-western Mexico. 
It is part of the Juquila District in the centre of the Costa Region.
The origen of Quiahije is not known, some people conjecture it might mean "Stone Forest" in the Zapotec language.

The municipality covers an area of 91.86 km² at an altitude of 1,960 metres above sea level. 
The climate is temperate humid with an average temperature of 16.4°C and annual rainfall of 847 mm.
The forests contain pines and oaks.
Wild fauna include deer, rabbits. iguanas, armadillos, squirrels, badgers, raccoons, wild boars, skunks, wildcats, foxes and coyotes.

As of 2005, the municipality had 593 households with a total population of 4154 of whom 3.517 people spoke the Chatino language or ChaqF tnyaJ. is one of the notable leaders in this community. He was killed in Santa Catarina Juquila on September 26, 1989. His assassination is unsolved Tomas Cruz Lorenzo
Economic activities include farming, animal husbandry and trade.
Quiahije is one of the centers of the Chatino people or ntenB chaqF tnyaJ, related to the Zapotec but with a distinct language.

References

Municipalities of Oaxaca